"The Love Game" is a song by Australian pop singer John Paul Young, released in September 1975 as the second single from his debut studio album, Hero (1975). The song peaked at number 4 on the Australian Kent Music Report.

Track listing 
7" (AP-10907)
 Side A "The Love Game" (Harry Vanda, George Young) - 3:30
 Side B "St. Louis" (Vanda, Young) - 3:44

Charts

Weekly charts

Year-end charts

Personnel 
 John Paul Young — Lead vocals
 Ian "Willie" Winter — Guitar
 Johnny Dick — Drums, percussion
 Warren Morgan — Keyboards, backing vocals
 Ronnie Peel — Bass, backing vocals)
 Ray Goodwin — Guitar

References

External links
 John Paul Young - The Love Game (7" single)
 45cat

John Paul Young songs
1975 songs
1975 singles
Songs written by Harry Vanda
Songs written by George Young (rock musician)
Song recordings produced by Harry Vanda
Song recordings produced by George Young (rock musician)
Albert Productions singles